The 1954–55 Bradford City A.F.C. season was the 42nd in the club's history.

The club finished 21st in Division Three North, and reached the 3rd round of the FA Cup.

Sources

References

Bradford City A.F.C. seasons
Bradford City